The Petite rivière à l'Ours (rivière à l'Ours) - West (English: "Little Bear River" - West) is a tributary of rivière à l'Ours, flowing in the municipality of Saint-Félicien, in the Le Domaine-du-Roy Regional County Municipality, in the administrative region of Saguenay–Lac-Saint-Jean, in the province of Quebec, in Canada.

The upper part of the Petite Rivière à l'Ours valley is served by forest roads. The lower part is served by chemin du rang Simple, chemin du rang Double and rue Notre-Dame.

Forestry is the main economic activity in the upper part of this valley; agriculture, for the lower part.

The surface of the Little Bear River is usually frozen from the beginning of December to the end of March, except the rapids areas; however, safe traffic on the ice is generally from mid-December to mid-March.

Geography 
The Little Bear River takes its source from an unidentified small lake, in the western part of the municipality from Saint-Félicien. This lake is fed by an area of marsh that surrounds it. The mouth of this small lake is located at:
  east of the course of the rivière à la Carpe;
  south-west of downtown Saint-Félicien;
  west of the mouth of the Little Bear River - West.

  towards the south-east crossing two small lakes, then towards the north-east, until the outlet of a stream (coming from the north-west);
  north-east, up to Chemin du rang Simple;
  to the east by crossing the Notre-Dame road, to the outlet (coming from the southwest) from lakes Cossette and Petit;
  towards the east by collecting a stream (coming from the northwest) and another (coming from the southwest), to its mouth. 

The Little Bear River flows into a bend on the west bank of the rivière à l'Ours. This confluence is located at:

  south of downtown Saint-Félicien;
  west of the mouth of the Ashuapmushuan River;
  northwest of downtown Roberval.

Toponymy 
The rivière à l'Ours has two tributaries with the same toponymic designation: Little Bear River. The watercourse covered by this article constitutes the western branch.

The toponym "Little Bear River" was formalized on December 5, 1968, at the Place Names Bank of the Commission de toponymie du Québec.

Notes and references

External links 

Rivers of Saguenay–Lac-Saint-Jean
Le Domaine-du-Roy Regional County Municipality